Nikita Zhloba (born 16 August 1995) is a Russian ice hockey defenceman. He is currently playing with Metallurg Magnitogorsk of the Kontinental Hockey League (KHL).

Zhloba made his Kontinental Hockey League debut playing with Metallurg Magnitogorsk during the 2014–15 KHL season.

References

External links

1995 births
Living people
Metallurg Magnitogorsk players
Russian ice hockey defencemen
People from Magnitogorsk
Sportspeople from Chelyabinsk Oblast